Local Hero is a 1983 Scottish comedy-drama film written and directed by Bill Forsyth and starring Peter Riegert, Denis Lawson, Fulton Mackay and Burt Lancaster. Produced by David Puttnam, the film is about an American oil company representative who is sent to the fictional village of Ferness on the west coast of Scotland to purchase the town and surrounding property for his company. For his work on the film, Forsyth won the 1984 BAFTA Award for Best Direction.

A stage musical adaptation received its world premiere in 2019. In the same year a Criterion Collection DVD/Blu-ray was released in September.

Plot
"Mac" MacIntyre is a typical 1980s hot-shot executive working for Knox Oil and Gas in Houston, Texas. The eccentric head of the company, Felix Happer, sends him (largely because his surname sounds Scottish) to acquire the village of Ferness in the Scottish Highlands to make way for a refinery. Mac (who is actually of Hungarian extraction) is a little apprehensive about his assignment, complaining to a co-worker that he would much rather take care of business over the phone and via telex. Happer, an avid astronomy buff, tells Mac to watch the sky and to notify him immediately if he sees anything unusual.

Upon arriving in Scotland, Mac teams up with local Knox representative Danny Oldsen. During a visit to a Knox research facility in Aberdeen, Dr. Geddes and his assistant Watt inform them about the scope of the company's plans, which entail replacing Ferness with the refinery. They also meet (and admire) marine researcher Marina.

Mac ultimately spends several weeks in Ferness, gradually adapting to the slower-paced life and getting to know the eccentric residents, most notably hotel owner and accountant Gordon Urquhart, and his wife Stella. As time passes, Mac becomes more and more conflicted as he presses to close the deal that will spell the end of the quaint little village he has come to love. Unbeknownst to him, however, the villagers are tired of their hard life and are more than eager to sell, though they feign indifference to induce a larger offer. Mac receives encouragement from an unlikely source: Victor, a capitalistic Soviet fishing boat captain who periodically visits his friends in Ferness (and checks on his investment portfolio, managed by Gordon).

Meanwhile, Danny befriends Marina, who is under the impression that the company is planning to build a research centre at Ferness. During a date, he discovers that Marina, who seems more at home in the water than on land, has webbed toes. While watching some grey seals, Danny mentions that sailors used to believe they were mermaids. Marina tells him the sailors were wrong.

As the deal nears completion, Gordon discovers that Ben Knox, an old beachcomber who lives in a driftwood shack on the shore, owns the beach through a grant from the Lord of the Isles to his ancestor. MacIntyre tries everything to entice Ben to sell, even offering enough money to buy any other beach in the world, but the owner is content with what he has. Ben picks up some sand and offers to sell for the same number of pound notes as he has grains of sand in his hand. A suspicious MacIntyre declines, only to be told there could not have been more than ten thousand grains.

Happer finally arrives on site, just in time to unknowingly forestall a potential confrontation between some of the villagers and Ben. When Mac informs him of the snag in the proceedings, he decides to negotiate personally with Ben and, in the process, discovers a kindred spirit. Happer opts to locate the refinery offshore and set up an astronomical observatory instead. He sends MacIntyre home to implement the changes. Danny brings up Marina's dream of an oceanographic research facility and suggests combining the two into the "Happer Institute", an idea that Happer likes. A sombre MacIntyre returns to his apartment in Houston. He pulls from his pocket pebbles and shells and spreads them out on the work surface. The local phone box in Ferness starts ringing.

Cast

Production

Development
When producer David Puttnam approached his regular backers Warner Bros. and Goldcrest Films to fund Local Hero,  they initially turned him down. When Puttnam won a BAFTA for Chariots of Fire in 1982 this convinced Goldcrest executives to  finance the entire film. Warner Bros. agreed to pay $1.5 million for US rights.

Casting
Puttnam always wanted Burt Lancaster to play Happer but the casting proved problematic because the Hollywood star wanted his $2 million salary, which was almost a third of the film's entire budget. However, upon learning of Lancaster's potential involvement in the project, Warner Bros. offered Puttnam a US distribution deal and provided the additional funding to secure Lancaster. After negotiations, Puttnam ended up having an additional $200,000 in the film's budget. He later remarked in an interview that "big stars are not a liability, they are an asset!".

Michael Douglas and Henry Winkler were both actively pursued by Bill Forsyth for the role of MacIntyre (which ultimately went to Peter Riegert).

Filming

Local Hero was filmed in several locations around Scotland. Most of the Ferness village scenes were filmed in Pennan on the Aberdeenshire coast, and most of the beach scenes at Morar and Arisaig on the west coast.

 Aberdeenshire, Scotland, UK
 Arisaig, Highland, Scotland, UK
 The Ship Inn, Banff, Scotland, UK (interior bar scenes) 
 Ben Nevis Distillery, Fort William, Highland, Scotland, UK
 Camusdarach Sands, Camusdarach, Morar, Mallaig, Highland, Scotland, UK (Ferness, beach scenes, including external scene of Ferness church, using a mock-up of Our Lady of the Braes church – see below – specially constructed beside the beach)
 Fort William, Highland, Scotland, UK
 Highlands, Scotland, UK
 Hilton, Highland, Scotland, UK (Ferness, village hall ceilidh)
 Lyndon B. Johnson Space Center, 2101 NASA Road, Houston, Texas, US (Knox Oil testing lab)
 Loch Eil, Highland, Scotland, UK
 Lochaber, Highland, Scotland, UK
 Lochailort, Highland, Scotland, UK (Ferness hotel, internal shots)
 Loch Tarff, Fort Augustus, Highland, Scotland (fog and rabbit scenes)
 Mallaig, Highland, Scotland, UK
 Moidart, Highland, Scotland, UK (road scenes for drive to Ferness – A861 descent to Loch Moidart and descent to Inversanda Bay)
 JPMorgan Chase Tower, formerly Texas Commerce Tower, 600 Travis St., Houston, Texas, US (Knox Oil headquarters)
 Our Lady of the Braes Roman Catholic Church, Polnish, Highland, Scotland, UK (Ferness, village church, internal scenes)
 Pennan, Aberdeenshire, Scotland, UK (Ferness, includes red phone box)
 Pole of Itlaw, Aberdeenshire, Scotland, UK (Ferness, village shop)

Soundtrack

The film's soundtrack was written and produced by Mark Knopfler of Dire Straits. This has led to the popularity of the film with fans of the band. Knopfler has since performed an arrangement of "Going Home (Theme of the Local Hero)" as an encore at many of his concerts. This tune borrows some melodic riffs from traditional songs. In his review of the album for AllMusic, William Ruhlmann wrote:

Gerry Rafferty provided the vocals for "The Way It Always Starts" on the soundtrack. The album was certified a BPI silver record.

Critical response
In his Chicago Sun-Times review, Roger Ebert gave the film his highest four stars, calling it "a small film to treasure". He gave particular praise to writer-director Bill Forsyth for his abilities as a storyteller.

James Berardinelli gave the film three and a half stars out of four, calling it "a fragment of cinematic whimsy—a genial dramatic comedy that defies both our expectations and those of the characters". Berardinelli also focused on Forsyth's abilities as a storyteller, noting that the director "finds the perfect tone for this not-quite-a-fairy-tale set in a quaint seaside Scottish village named Ferness. By injecting a little (but not too much) magical realism into the mix, Forsyth leavens his pro-environmental message to the point that those not looking for it might not be conscious of its presence." Berardinelli concluded that Local Hero represents "the best kind of light fare: a motion picture that offers a helping of substance to go along with an otherwise frothy and undemanding main course".

The New York Times critic Janet Maslin wrote, "Genuine fairy tales are rare; so is film-making that is thoroughly original in an unobtrusive way. Bill Forsyth's quirky disarming Local Hero is both." Maslin concluded:

In Variety magazine, film critic Todd McCarthy wrote, "After making the grade internationally with the sleeper hit, Gregory's Girl, Scottish writer-director Bill Forsyth has broken the sophomore sesh jinx the only way he could, by making an even better film ... Given a larger canvas, director Forsyth has in no way attempted to overreach himself or the material, keeping things modest and intimate throughout, but displaying a very acute sense of comic insight."

Almar Haflidason called Local Hero "a wry film that slowly slips under the skin to surprising effect" in BBC Home. Haflidason concludes, "Once over, the mood of the film hits home and a longing develops to visit once again the characters of this warm and deceptively slight comedy."

For Movie Gazette, Gary Panton described the film as a "magical, intelligent comedy". Panton praised the cinematography as "little short of amazing" and that Local Hero was "Bill Forsyth's finest work of all, this is a perfect film."

During his 2000 campaign for the presidency, U.S. Vice President Al Gore told Oprah Winfrey in an interview that Local Hero was his favorite film.

On Rotten Tomatoes, the film received a rare 100% positive rating based on 36 reviews, with a weighted average of 8.80/10. The site's consensus reads: "A charmingly low-key character study brought to life by a tremendously talented cast, Local Hero is as humorous as it is heartwarming". On Metacritic, the film has a score of 82 out of 100, based on reviews from 15 critics.

Some Scottish critics were less enthusiastic about the film, pointing out that it repeated and reinforced long-established cinematic representations of Scotland and the Scots and perpetuated a comforting but misleading narrative about Scotland's relationship with international capitalism. The Glasgow Women and Film Collective questioned what it saw as the film's male-oriented narrative about innocence and power and the marginal roles it accorded to women.

Box office
Local Hero earned $5,895,761 in total gross sales in the United States. Goldcrest Films invested £2,551,000 in the film and received £3,290,000, earning them a profit of £739,000.

Awards and nominations

Legacy
The minor planet 7345 Happer is named after Lancaster's character in the film and his quest to have a comet named after him.

Stage musical adaptation 

A stage musical based on the film premiered at the Royal Lyceum Theatre, Edinburgh in spring 2019. The musical featured music and lyrics by Mark Knopfler (writer of the film soundtrack) and a book by Bill Forsyth (original film screenwriter and director) and David Greig, and was directed by John Crowley. The musical was due to transfer to The Old Vic in London in summer 2020, but due to the COVID-19 pandemic the run was cancelled. A new production directed by Daniel Evans will open in summer 2022 at the Minerva Theatre, Chichester.

See also
 BFI Top 100 British films
 List of films with a 100% rating on Rotten Tomatoes
 Cinema of Scotland

References

External links
 
 
 
 
 Local Hero at Bill Forsyth website
Local Hero: Our Man in Ferness an essay by Jonathan Murray at the Criterion Collection

1980s English-language films
English-language Scottish films
1980s British films
1983 comedy films
1983 comedy-drama films
1983 drama films
1983 films
1983 independent films
British comedy-drama films
British independent films
Films about real estate holdout
Films directed by Bill Forsyth
Films produced by David Puttnam
Films set in Houston
Films set on beaches
Films set in Scotland
Films shot in Houston
Films shot in Scotland
Films whose director won the Best Direction BAFTA Award
Goldcrest Films films
Scottish films
Warner Bros. films